Alalcomenia was, in Greek mythology, one of the daughters of Ogyges and the eponym of Alalcomenae. She and her two sisters, Thelxionoea and Aulis, were regarded as supernatural beings who watched over oaths and saw that they were not taken rashly or thoughtlessly. Their name was the Praxidikai, and they had a temple in common at the foot of the Telphusian mount in Boeotia.

These three were sometimes rendered as a single goddess, Praxidike, "she who exacts punishment". The representations of these divinities consisted of bodiless heads. Like other Greek deities, animals were sacrificed to them, but only the heads.

Notes

References 

 Pausanias, Description of Greece with an English Translation by W.H.S. Jones, Litt.D., and H.A. Ormerod, M.A., in 4 Volumes. Cambridge, MA, Harvard University Press; London, William Heinemann Ltd. 1918. . Online version at the Perseus Digital Library
Pausanias, Graeciae Descriptio. 3 vols. Leipzig, Teubner. 1903.  Greek text available at the Perseus Digital Library.
Smith, William. (1870). Dictionary of Greek and Roman Biography and Mythology. London: Taylor, Walton, and Maberly.
Stephanus of Byzantium, Stephani Byzantii Ethnicorum quae supersunt, edited by August Meineike (1790-1870), published 1849. A few entries from this important ancient handbook of place names have been translated by Brady Kiesling. Online version at the Topos Text Project.
Suida, Suda Encyclopedia translated by Ross Scaife, David Whitehead, William Hutton, Catharine Roth, Jennifer Benedict, Gregory Hays, Malcolm Heath Sean M. Redmond, Nicholas Fincher, Patrick Rourke, Elizabeth Vandiver, Raphael Finkel, Frederick Williams, Carl Widstrand, Robert Dyer, Joseph L. Rife, Oliver Phillips and many others. Online version at the Topos Text Project.

Women in Greek mythology
Boeotian characters in Greek mythology
Religion in ancient Boeotia
Greek animal sacrifice